Network Q RAC Rally (Rally in the US) is a rally computer game that is part of the Rally Championship series. The game was released for MS-DOS in November 1993. It was developed by British studio Pixelkraft and published by Europress Software, five years after Europress published the game Lombard RAC Rally, developed by Red Rat Software. A sequel was released in 1996, called Network Q RAC Rally Championship.

Reception
Computer Gaming World in March 1994 reported that Rallys graphics were "strong" and that "the night time driving is about the best in any racing simulation". The magazine approved of the navigator voice's use of racing jargon. Elsewhere in the issue, the magazine said that the game "might be a fun experience for serious rally sports, but those racing fans who've grown accustomed to more detailed driving sims will probably race on by". In April 1994 the magazine stated that "Rally just doesn't cut the mustard in the realism department". Citing lack of collision detection, "both sloppy and oversensitive" controls, repeated crashes, lack of drafting, replays, or camera angles, and the competing IndyCar Racing and World Circuit, the magazine concluded that "die-hard racers will want to look elsewhere before considering Rally".

References

External links

1993 video games
Accolade (company) games
Cancelled Super Nintendo Entertainment System games
DOS games
FM Towns games
NEC PC-9801 games
Rally racing video games
Video games developed in the United Kingdom
Multiplayer and single-player video games